Lady Bird  is an album by saxophonist Archie Shepp, recorded in 1978.

Recording and music 
Lady Bird was recorded in New York City on December 7, 1978. Shepp plays alto sax on the album, with Jaki Byard (piano), Cecil McBee (bass), and Roy Haynes (drums).

Release 
The album was released by Denon Records.

Track listing 
"Donna Lee" (Charlie Parker)
"Relaxin' at Camarillo" (Parker)
"Now's the Time" (Parker)
"Lady Bird" (Tadd Dameron)
"Flamingo" (Ed Anderson, Ted Grouya)

Personnel 
 Archie Shepp – alto sax
 Jaki Byard – piano
 Cecil McBee – bass
 Roy Haynes – drums

References 

1979 albums
Denon Records albums